Bo Atterberry (born February 21, 1975) is an American football coach.  He served as the head football coach at Texas A&M University–Kingsville from 2007 to 2012 and Southeastern Oklahoma State University from 2013 to 2018. Atterberry was named the head football coach at Arkansas Tech University in December 2018, but stepped down from that post in March 2019 because of health reasons.

After taking over the Texas A&M–Kingsville Javelinas program in 2007, he compiled a 41–28 record over his tenure while guiding Texas A&M–Kingsville to a Lone Star Conference (LSC) championship in 2009 and back-to-back NCAA Division II playoff appearances.  Atterberry earned LSC Coach of the Year honors in 2012, as well as AFCA Regional Coach of the Year honors in 2010, and was a finalist for the Liberty Mutual National Coach of the Year in 2009.  Over his tenure he coached 22 first team All-LSC selections, 16 all-region honorees and 11 All-Americans.  On December 4, 2013 Atterberry was introduced as the 19th head football coach in Southeastern Oklahoma State's history.  Atterberry led the 2014 Southeastern team to their first winning season since 2009 in his first year as head coach.

Head coaching record

References

External links
 Southeastern Oklahoma State profile

1975 births
Living people
Arkansas Tech Wonder Boys football coaches
Southeastern Oklahoma State Savage Storm football coaches
Texas A&M–Kingsville Javelinas football coaches